The Orange County Fair, abbreviated as the OC Fair, is a 23-day annual fair that is held every summer at the OC Fair & Event Center in Costa Mesa, California. The 2023 OC Fair is from July 21 to August 20, and the theme will be announced soon.

Fair patrollers include security guards, the Costa Mesa Police & Orange County (CA) Sheriff's Office.

History
The fair first took place in the year 1890 and consisted of some minor exhibits in Santa Ana and a horse race. From 1890 to 1894 the fair was run by the Orange County Community Fair Corporation, but was then taken over by the Orange County Fair Association, Inc. Early fairs mainly consisted of horse races and livestock shows, but around 1900 new carnival-like attractions were added and the fair become a yearly occurrence. The fair was located in Santa Ana, except for a brief interval after World War I, when it was moved to Huntington Beach.

Starting in 1916, the fair was managed by the Orange County Farm Bureau. An Orange County Fair Board was elected in 1925, and the fair was moved to Anaheim with the addition of a rodeo and carnival. From 1932 to 1939, the fair was located in Pomona, California as part of a combined Orange, Los Angeles, and Riverside County Fair. Following World War II the 32nd District Agricultural Association was formed by the state of California, and it took on the task of running the fair. The state purchased land from the Santa Ana Army Air Base and set some of it aside for use as a new fairgrounds. In 1949 the fair became a five-day-long event and was relocated to the old army base, which quickly became the permanent location.

The city of Costa Mesa was incorporated in 1953 with the fair residing in its boundaries. The fairgrounds' 150 acres has been the home of the fair ever since 1949 and has expanded to an annual 23 day summer event.

On April 27, 2020 for the first time in 75 years, the 2020 fair was cancelled in response to the COVID-19 pandemic; since 2021, hand sanitizers were installed within the premises, to prevent this and other diseases from spreading, plus social distancing & wearing masks are being adhered to. It was also cancelled in 1917–18 & 1942–45.

Fairground sale
In May 2009, then Governor Arnold Schwarzenegger recommended the Orange County Fairgrounds be listed for sale. He had decided the fairgrounds were "surplus or underutilized" assets,  although the Fair hosts more than one million visitors each year and is utilized virtually every day of the week with multiple community activities. OC Weekly reported, "What followed was a story of deception by a small group in a position of power within the fairgrounds hierarchy. Through various contractual agreements between people of wealth and power, a move was made to privatize that public land in what members of the Orange County Fairgrounds Preservation Society call one of the largest, most deliberate land grabs in the county's long history of land grabs." The Preservation Society quickly stepped in to halt the sale. They contended that the OC legislators in Sacramento had been remiss in intervening to stop the transaction, that the proposed deal to sell public land was both "Ill-advised and illegal." Both the Del Mar Fairgrounds and the Los Angeles Memorial Coliseum were saved by just such an intervention by the legislators.

A public auction was held, but before any sales agreements could be signed, there were two lawsuits filed and the sale was stopped. The Preservation Society, and Tel Phil Enterprises filed in the Court of Appeal and asked that the new governor Jerry Brown have the sale categorically dismissed. Lawsuits by two former building commissioners that Schwarzenegger had fired, however, stalled the proposed sale long enough for incoming Governor Brown to have the final word.

OCFEC Board of Directors response
After a closed session on January 27, 2011, the OCFEC Board of Directors issued the following policy statement regarding the sale of the fairgrounds:

On February 8, 2011, the 32nd District Agricultural Association sent a letter to Governor Jerry Brown, which can be viewed as a PDF at the site.

Gubernatorial response
In February 2011, California Governor Jerry Brown told the Los Angeles Times, "This is not the best time to be selling real estate.  I think we have time to consider what we ought to do with that."  He also said that his predecessor's plan, rather than helping California's budget crisis, would "have cost taxpayers far more in the long run." Assemblyman Jose Solorio (D-Santa Ana)  stated that Brown's comments were "a good sign."

Attendance
The Orange County Fair is the 9th-largest fair in the United States. Since 2021, attendance is limited to 45,000 people per day.

Climate
The Fairground in Costa Mesa has a Mediterranean climate (Köppen climate classification Csb), that is nearly perfect for its many outdoor activities.

Gallery

References

Further reading

External links

Orange County, California culture
Annual fairs
Fairs in California
Tourist attractions in Costa Mesa, California
Recurring events established in 1890
1890 establishments in California